Robert Luther "Strauss" "Big" Stovall (February 22, 1886 – January 8, 1949) was a college football player and a unit foreman of the state highway department.

College football
Stovall was a center  for the 1908 LSU Tigers football team which went 10–0 and was selected as national champion by the National Championship Foundation. His younger brother Rowson Stovall was also on the team, called "Little" Stovall in contrast to his "Big" brother. Robert was selected All-Southern by Grantland Rice in 1909.

References

1886 births
1949 deaths
Players of American football from Louisiana
LSU Tigers football players
All-Southern college football players
American football centers
People from Dodson, Louisiana